Tiruvalla Taluk (alternately spelt Thiruvalla) Taluk is a Tehsil ( Sub-District ) of Pathanamthitta district in the Indian state of Kerala. The headquarters of the Taluk is in Tiruvalla town, which lies almost in the centre of the Taluk. It has an area of 152 sq. km and a population of 3,23,503. All three major rivers of the Central Travancore region- the Pamba, the Manimala, and the Achenkovil flow through the Taluk. 

Thiruvalla taluk is noted for its large NRI community, most of whom are either Gulf Malayalis or have permanently settled in the West. This has had a considerable influence on the culture of the region. They taluk is also known for its large number of banks. Most major nationalised banks have branches in the taluk. Thiruvalla taluk is widely considered to be the commercial, financial and cultural capital of Central Travancore.

History 
The Taluk is an older settlement of Brahmins and Syrian Christians, and has developed a cosmopolitan culture resulting from the peaceful co-existence of the two communities. The various places in Tiruvalla have a different history to tell.

For the history of the places in Tiruvalla, refer: History of Tiruvalla city, History of Niranam, History of Koipuram, History of Kumbanad, History of Kavumbhagom from the respective wiki articles.

Famous personalities from the taluk 
 Poykayil Yohannan   , social activist,social reformer, poet and the founder of PRDS
 Vennikkulam Gopala Kurup, Poet (Mahakavi Vennikkulam Gopala Kurup )
 Vishnunarayanan Namboothiri , Indian writer and scholar of Malayalam literature
 Madhava Panikkar, Sankara Panikkar, and Rama Panikkar -  The Niranam poets, also known as the Kannassan poets, were three poets from the same family
 KT Chacko,former International Footballer, Indian goalkeeper
 Abraham Kovoor, famous hypnotherapist and rationalist
 Abraham Mulamoottil, a Catholic priest, author, educationist, innovator, and philosopher
 Abu Abraham, famous cartoonist
 Babu Thiruvalla, movie director and producer
 Baselios Marthoma Didymos I, former Malankara Metropolitan & Catholicos of Malankara, India and All the East (Malankara Orthodox Church)
 Blessy (Blessy Iype Thomas), movie director
 C. K. Ra, famous artist
 C.P. Mathen (1890–1960), banker and founder of the Quilon Bank, Member of Parliament from Mavelikkara Constituency to the first Lok Sabha (1952), Indian Ambassador to the Sudan (1957)
 John Abraham, movie director
 K. G. George, movie director
 Kailash, movie actor
 Kakkanadan, novelist and writer
 Kaveri, movie actress
 Kaviyoor Ponnamma, movie actress
 Kaviyoor Sivaprasad,Film Director
 Kailash ,movie Actor
 M. G. Soman, movie actor
 Dr. M.M. Thomas, former Governor of Nagaland, Chairperson of the World Council of Churchers (WCC)
 Mathew T. Thomas, MLA 2006–present, and 1987–1991, Janata Dal, former transport minister of Kerala (2006–2009)
 Meera Jasmine (Jasmine Mary Joseph), movie actress
 Nadiya Moythu, movie actress
 Nayantara (Diana Mariam Kurien, Kodiyattu), movie actress
 Parvathy (Ashwathy Kurup), movie actress
 Rajeev Pillai, model and movie actor
 Sidhartha Siva, Actor, Director
 J. Philipose, Writer/satirist

Places in Tiruvalla Taluk 
 Niranam
 Kadapra
 Neerattupuram
 Kuttoor
 Peringara
 Nedumpuram
 Kuttappuzha
 Kallooppara
 Kaviyoor
 Koipuram
 Thottapuzhassery
 Eraviperoor
 Kavumbhagom
 Pullad
 Maramon
 Parumala
 Chathenkary
 Mathilbhagom
 Anjilithanam
 Poovathoor
 Kuriannoor

PIN Codes 
 Tiruvalla                                                     689101
 Anjilithanam                                               689582
 Ezhumattoor                                              689586
 Kavumbhagom                                          689102
 Kuttapuzha (Kizhakkanmuthoor)               689103
 Manjadi Junction (Meenthalakara)            689105
 Muthoor                                                     689107
 R.S.P.O. (Kuttapuzha)                              689111
 Kuttoor                                                      689106
 Thadiyoor                                                  689545
 Valanjavattom                                           689104
 Karackal, Peringara                                  689108
 Podiyadi                                                    689110
 Thirumoolapuram                                     689115
Chathankari                                              689112
 Pullad 689548
 Kumbanad 689547
 Alanthuruthy, Azhyadathuchira 689113
 Venpala 689114 – (Kuttoor panchyath)
 Azyidathuchira 689113
 Vallamkulam(nannoor) 689541
 Eraviperoor 689542
 Othera 689546
 West Othera 689551
 Nedumpuram 689578
 Kaviyoor 689580
 Mepral 689591
 Mundiappally 689581
 M. North 689543
 Kuriannoor 689550

Taluks of Kerala
Geography of Pathanamthitta district
Thiruvalla